Juanita Millender-McDonald (September 7, 1938 – April 22, 2007) was an American politician who served as a member of the United States House of Representatives from 1996 until her death in 2007, representing California's 37th congressional district, which includes most of South Central Los Angeles and the city of Long Beach, California. She was a member of the Democratic Party.

On December 19, 2006, Millender-McDonald was named Chairwoman of the House Committee on House Administration for the 110th Congress. She was the first African-American woman to chair the committee. She was also a member of the Congressional Black Caucus and of the New Democrat Coalition and was considered a front-runner for the job of Secretary of Transportation if John Kerry had been elected President in 2004.

Biography
Millender-McDonald was born in Birmingham, Alabama. She was educated at Los Angeles Harbor College; at the University of Redlands, from which she received a business degree; and at California State University, Los Angeles, from which she earned a masters in educational administration; and the University of Southern California, from which she completed her doctorate in public administration. She worked as a teacher, a textbook editor, and later as director of a nonprofit organization working for gender issues. She was a member of Alpha Kappa Alpha sorority. Millender-McDonald served as a member of the City Council of Carson, California and was a member of the California State Assembly (after beating two sitting incumbent Democrats that had been reapportioned into the same Carson based assembly district in 1992) before entering the House. She was first elected to the House in a March 1996 special election to replace Congressman Walter Tucker, who resigned due to corruption charges and was later sentenced to 27 months in prison. While she won a difficult nine-candidate primary in her first election run (fellow assembly member Willard Murray came in a close second) she did not face any serious opposition in any of her reelection campaigns.

In Congress, she was known for her commitment to protecting international human rights. Millender-McDonald worked to aid victims of genocide and human trafficking. In 1996, she also led an inquiry into allegations that the CIA was working with cocaine traffickers to fund Contra rebels in Nicaragua.

Within a week of her requesting a leave of absence to deal with her illness, on April 22, 2007, Millender-McDonald died in hospice care, succumbing to colon cancer at the age of 68 at her home in Carson. She left a husband, James McDonald, Jr., and five adult children.

Successor

Congresswoman Millender-McDonald's seat was vacant until Laura Richardson won the August 21, 2007, special election. Under California law, Governor Arnold Schwarzenegger announced a special election date of June 26, and because no candidate received more than 50% of the total vote, the candidates with the most votes in their respective parties participated in an August 21 runoff. In the June Primary, State Senator Jenny Oropeza lost to State Assemblywoman Laura Richardson, with Richardson continuing to the August special election, when she defeated Republican John M. Kanaley, Libertarian Herb Peters, and Green Daniel Brezenoff.

Electoral history

*Write-in and minor candidate notes:  In 2000, Herb Peters received 3,150 votes.

See also
 List of African-American United States representatives
 List of United States Congress members who died in office
 Women in the United States House of Representatives

References

External links

 Federal Election Commission – Juanita Millender-McDonald campaign finance reports and data
 On the Issues – Juanita Millender-McDonald issue positions and quotes
 OpenSecrets.org – Juanita Millender-McDonald campaign contributions
 Juanita Millender-McDonald Political History profile
 Project Vote Smart – Representative Juanita Millender-McDonald (CA) profile
  allegation of CIA drug dealing
 Join California Juanita Millender-McDonald
 

|-

1938 births
2007 deaths
20th-century American politicians
20th-century American women politicians
21st-century American politicians
21st-century American women politicians
African-American members of the United States House of Representatives
African-American state legislators in California
African-American women in politics
Baptists from Alabama
California city council members
California State University, Los Angeles alumni
Deaths from cancer in California
Deaths from colorectal cancer
Female members of the United States House of Representatives
Democratic Party members of the California State Assembly
Democratic Party members of the United States House of Representatives from California
Politicians from Birmingham, Alabama
People from Carson, California
University of Redlands alumni
USC Rossier School of Education alumni
Women city councillors in California
Women state legislators in California
African-American city council members in California
20th-century Baptists
20th-century African-American women
20th-century African-American politicians
21st-century African-American women
21st-century African-American politicians